Kinsale Road power station is a 1.8MW gas-fired combined heat and power electricity generating station which uses the methane gas released from decomposing organic matter in the adjoining landfill site as its fuel source. The site supplies approximately 4% of Cork City's power demand.

References

Power stations in the Republic of Ireland
Biofuel power stations in Ireland
Buildings and structures in Cork (city)